Bradyrrhoa trapezella is a species of snout moth in the genus Bradyrrhoa. It was described by Philogène Auguste Joseph Duponchel in 1837 and is known from the Canary Islands, Italy, France, Croatia, North Macedonia and Turkey.

References

Phycitini
Moths described in 1837
Moths of Europe
Moths of Asia